Zarnan (also romanized as Zarnān; also known as Zarnān-e Bālā, Qal‘eh-ye Bālā Zarnān, and Zard Āb) is a village in Danesh Rural District, in the Central District of Qods County, Tehran Province, Iran. At the 2006 census, its population was 562, in 155 families.

References 

Populated places in Qods County